(The guest of the sevillano-inn) is a 1926 zarzuela in two acts with music by Jacinto Guerrero and a libretto by Juan Ignacio Luca de Tena with Enrique Reoyo.

It is set in the 16th century, and the anonymous guest at the inn is in fact Miguel de Cervantes.

References

Compositions by Jacinto Guerrero
Zarzuelas
Operas
1926 operas
Spanish-language operas